The 1948 Mississippi State Maroons football team represented Mississippi State College during the 1948 college football season. This was the only of head coach Allyn McKeen's nine seasons that did not end in a winning record for the Maroons. Despite the strong record—his .764 (65–19–3) winning percentage is the best in school history—McKeen was fired after the season. The Maroons, who had won seven or more games in six of McKeen's nine seasons, did not post another seven-win season until 1963.

Schedule

The Clemson matchup was mentioned in a Jerry Clower comedy sketch in the 1974 Country Ham album.

References

Mississippi State
Mississippi State Bulldogs football seasons
Mississippi State Maroons football